Hidden Treasures of Swat is a non-fiction book based on the achievements of Italian Archaeological Mission (IAM) in Pakistan and Department of Archaeology and Museums (DOAM) Pakistan. Six major discoveries by Italian archaeologists in Swat District of the Khyber Pukhtunkhwa province of Pakistan are discussed in the book.

References 

23042: Code for Hidden Treasures of Swat in National Library of Pakistan.
The Italian Archaeological Mission in Pakistan Domenico Faccenna and Sebastiano Tusa East and West Vol. 36, No. 4 (December 1986), pp. 473–511 Published by: Istituto Italiano per l'Africa e l'Oriente (IsIAO).
Book: Travels of Tibetan Pilgrims in the Swat Valley by Giuseppe Tucci

2014 non-fiction books
Archaeology books
Books about Pakistan